The DS-16 is a Canadian trailerable sailboat, that was designed by G. Diller and Herman Schwill and first built in 1970.

Production
The boat was built by Diller-Schwill (DS Yachts) in Odessa, Ontario Canada, but it is now out of production.

Design

The DS-16 is a small recreational keelboat, built predominantly of fiberglass, with wood trim. It has a fractional sloop rig, a transom-hung rudder and a fixed shallow draft keel or optionally a centreboard. It displaces  and carries  of ballast.

The boat is normally fitted with a small outboard motor for docking and maneuvering.

Operational history
In a review Michael McGoldrick wrote, "The DS 16 is probably the smallest sailboat with lockable cuddy cabin that you'll find... The cabin has a little over 3 feet (1 metre) of sitting headroom and is supposed to have enough space for a double berth, although it's likely to be extremely cramped for two adults... With a total length of 16 feet (4.88 m) and weight of only 650 pounds (295 kg), it should be possible to trailer the DS 16 with almost any car."

See also
List of sailing boat types

Related development
DS-22

Similar sailboats
Balboa 16
Bombardier 4.8
Catalina 16.5
Laguna 16
Leeward 16
Martin 16
Nordica 16
Sirocco 15
Tanzer 16
Watkins 17

References

External links

Keelboats
1970s sailboat type designs
Sailing yachts
Trailer sailers
Sailboat type designs by Herman Schwill
Sailboat type designs by G. Diller
Sailboat types built by DS Yachts